Bidu (also Romanized as Bīdū; also known as Bīdū Sarḩad) is a village in Tashan Rural District, Riz District, Jam County, Bushehr Province, Iran. At the 2006 census, its population was 173, in 39 families.

References 

Populated places in Jam County